Juan Martín del Potro was the defending champion, but chose not to participate that year.

Seeds
The top four seeds receive a bye into the second round.

Main draw

Finals

Top half

Bottom half

External links
Main draw
Qualifying draw

Singles